Lars Bondeson (1865-1908) was the stage name of Carl Jansson-Öhlin, who was one of the founders of Swedish bondkomik (rustic humor). Born in Örebro in 1865, he was a singer, storyteller, lyricist and music publisher. His songbooks were a  major influence on countless entertainers in Sweden and America.

Career
Lars Bondeson called himself "Sweden’s original rustic comic". At the same time that Jödde i Göljaryd (Karl Peter Rosén) was establishing the wardrobe and repertoire for a new form of entertainment, he was appearing at the Alhambra Variety Theatre in Stockholm.  Bondeson — in contrast to Jödde i Göljaryd — took rustic humor into the world of commercial entertainment via vaudeville, dance halls and folk parks.  He collected tunes and songs, which he had discovered or in some cases written himself, and published them in ten songbooks.  He died in 1908, having seldom performed in later years.  His career in show business had, in fact, lasted only from 1891 until 1895.

Bondeson's songs were recorded in America by Gustav Fonandern, Joel Mossberg, Olle i Skratthult and Charles G. Widdén. The Minnesota Historical Society has his songbooks  and other publications to which he contributed in its collections.

Gallery

References

External links 
Lars Bondeson at Swedish music and film.
Lars Bondeson at the Swedish media database.
Photos
L to R: Sven Ehrling and Lars Bondeson
L to R: Lars Bondeson and Ernst Rolf
Lars Bondeson photo captions
Victor Records
Lars Bondeson (songwriter) 
Songs published by Lars Bondeson   
Lyrics
Lars Bondeson songbook 
Streaming audio
Lars Bondeson at the National Library of Sweden. 
Lars Bondeson at the Cylinder Audio Archive.
Lars Bondeson at the Internet Archive.

Swedish comedy writers
Swedish entertainers
Swedish songwriters
Swedish-language writers
1865 births
1908 deaths